The 2004–05 Combined Counties Football League season was the 27th in the history of the Combined Counties Football League, a football competition in England.

Premier Division

The Premier Division featured two new teams in a league of 24 teams after the promotion of AFC Wimbledon to the Isthmian League.
AFC Guildford, promoted from Division One
Colliers Wood United, promoted from Division One

League table

Division One

Division One featured two new teams in a league of 18 teams:
Bedfont Green, joined from the Surrey County Intermediate League (Western)
Warlingham, joined from the Surrey South Eastern Combination

Also, Chobham & Ottershaw changed their name to Chobham.

League table

References

 League tables

External links
 Combined Counties League Official Site

2004-05
9